is an action role-playing game for the Game Boy Advance. It was developed by Nextech and Grasshopper Manufacture, as the sequel to Shining Soul and part of the Shining series.

The game is a dungeon crawling hack and slash, playing similarly to Diablo or Baldur's Gate: Dark Alliance. It features eight playable characters, ten dungeons tied into a storyline, and eight hidden dungeons to explore. The game supports multiplayer via link cable as well as single player.

Gameplay
The game features eight character classes which can be improved up to level 200. Each is customisable with a variety of weapons, spells, support abilities, and attributes. Different classes who can use the same weapons attack differently with them. For example, the Warrior's spear attack is a thrust, while the Archer throws his spear over a distance.  Each usable spell in the game has its own spellbook, and only classes with that spell on their skills list can use the spellbook to cast the spell.

Warrior - A well balanced melee class. Default name: Eric (Alex in Japanese).
Archer - Attacks from afar using bows and spears, and summons forest creatures. Default name: Rwinn (Luin in Japanese).
Sorceress - Uses a variety of offensive elemental spells from a distance. Default name: Premiera (Pamela in Japanese).
Dragonute - The slowest but toughest melee class. Default name: Tyroth (Tiros in Japanese).
Priestess - Specializes in healing and support spells. Default name: Prim.
Dark Wizard - Uses Dark elemental spells. Default name: Armand (Bloodstar in Japanese).
Brawler - The most powerful and quick offensive melee class, but suffers from low defense. Default name: Zachs (Sachs in Japanese).
Ninja - A swift medium-ranged class using a mix of spells and physical attacks. Default name: Raizen.
??? - A Dark wizard similar to Armand; secret character who becomes available after beating the game once. Has no default name.

Each character is able to equip up to three weapons and three items for use, and switch between them at any time. The player can get 3 extra slots for either by equipping the Backpack or Knapsack. Attacks are performed by tapping the attack button, or holding to charge a more powerful attack. Beyond regular equipment, a "Soul" item can also be equipped; it is charged by defeating enemies, and unleashed to inflict massive damage on nearby enemies. They come in various elemental types and levels of effectiveness. They are graded on the Roman numerals I, II, III, IV and V, with V being the strongest and taking the longest to charge up.

Characters also have resistances to a number of elements: Fire, Ice, Thunder, Light, Dark and Poison. These can be raised by equipment, but also through endurance: by taking damage of a particular elemental kind, they can increase their resistance to it, but being killed by an attack of that type will decrease the resistance level by a point.

Multiplayer
The multiplayer is very similar to that of Diablo. The player characters navigate the dungeon and attack monsters. Players can give items to each other by throwing or dropping them. The party can only move to the next area when every player character has either passed the exit point of the current area or died. Opening the inventory window does not pause the game (in singleplayer or multiplayer), so some players can reorganize their inventory while others engage in combat. Some classes are more useful in multiplayer, such as the priestess or archer.

Plot
Shining Soul II has little connection to the storyline of the rest of the series aside from a reference to the events of Shining Soul in the introduction. However, an alternate universe version of Boken from Shining Force appears as a major NPC, traditional Shining mascot Yogurt is hidden in one of the stages, and a number of dungeons from the original Shining Soul appear as short hidden dungeons.

Centuries after the defeat of Dark Dragon in Shining Soul, light had become too strong, opening the way to a resurgence of darkness. A crystal in the possession of King Marcel and Queen Yvonne of Klantol, which throughout the story reflects the current balance of light and darkness, turns from shining to cloudy. An alchemist named Gillespie, a member of a dark order, the Chaos Knights, worms his way into the friendship of King Marcel's most trusted knight, Deatharte. Gillespie then disappears, leaving something called "the forbidden fruit" with Deatharte. Driven by curiosity, Deatharte eventually eats the fruit and is corrupted by darkness.

Later, a tournament at the Klantol Colosseum is interrupted by news that Princess Camille has been abducted. King Marcel orders Deatharte to search for her. Deatharte pretends to obey, but instead goes to join the Chaos Knights. Since Marcel is also concerned about an army of goblins mustering near the castle, he sends a promising young participant in the tournament (the player character) to investigate. Penetrating the goblin fort, the young hero not only confirms that the goblins were planning an attack on the castle, but learns that they abducted Camille and delivered her to the evil witch Wizari, who plans to sacrifice her to increase her power. The hero defeats the goblins and recovers the key to Camille's prison. Since Deatharte has naturally still not returned, Marcel relies upon the young hero to journey to Wizari's palace and save Camille. He succeeds in doing this and slaying Wizari.

The celebration is short-lived, as normally peaceful beings are driven mad by darkness. The hero's investigations of these incidents takes him to the mainland of Klantol, where he uncovers a plot by the Chaos Knights to conquer the world. Meanwhile, Princess Camille sneaks away to find Gillespie and manages to learn the password to the Chaos Knights' hidden stronghold. She is later trapped in Koldazhek Cave, but is rescued by the hero and tells him the password. Infiltrating the Chaos Knights' stronghold, the hero slays both Gillespie and Deatharte, who had become leader of the Chaos Knights.

The defeat of the Chaos Knights, however, causes a violent shift in balance from darkness to light, awakening a destructive power called Chaos, which even the forces of darkness fear. Marcel, Yvonne, Camille, and the court wizard are spirited away by Chaos. A former knight guides the hero to a passage to Chaos's realm. The hero goes there and defeats Chaos, rescuing the four prisoners and restoring balance to the world.

Reception

Shining Soul II received "average" reviews according to the review aggregation website Metacritic.  In Japan, Famitsu gave it a score of all four eights for a total of 32 out of 40.  The earliest reviews came from Electronic Gaming Monthly (nearly four months prior to the game's release), Game Informer (nearly three months prior), and Nintendo Power (nearly two months prior).

Notes

References

External links

2003 video games
Action role-playing video games
Atlus games
Cooperative video games
Game Boy Advance games
Game Boy Advance-only games
Grasshopper Manufacture games
Japanese role-playing video games
Multiplayer and single-player video games
Nex Entertainment games
Role-playing video games
Shining (series)
THQ games
Video games developed in Japan
Video games featuring female protagonists
Video games scored by Masafumi Takada